Jesse Slocumb (August 20, 1780 – December 20, 1820) was a U.S. Congressional Representative from North Carolina.

Early life
Slocumb was born on a plantation near Dudley in Wayne County, North Carolina on August 20, 1780. He was the son of Revolutionary patriots Col. Ezekiel Slocumb (1750–1840) and Mary Hooks Slocumb (1760–1836), who had distinguished herself at the Battle of Moore's Creek Bridge in 1776.

Career
He completed the preparatory studies and then engaged in agricultural pursuits, on a plantation six miles southeast of Goldsboro, North Carolina.

He held several local offices and was a member of the court of pleas and quarter sessions of the county. He served as the register of deeds from 1802 until 1808.

He was elected as a Federalist to succeed William Gaston to represent North Carolina's 4th congressional district in the Fifteenth and Sixteenth Congresses and served from March 4, 1817, until his death.  After his death, William S. Blackledge succeeded him.

Personal life
Slocumb was married to Hannah Gray Green (1787–1848), a daughter of Joseph Green. Together, they were the parents of:

 Julia Ann Slocumb, who married David Bunting.
 Harriet Adeline Slocumb (1809–1875), who married Hiram Wildman Husted (1802–1868).
 John Charles Slocumb (b. 1811), who married Rachel R. Wright.
 Junius Greene Slocumb (b. 1815), who married Mary L. Boon.

Slocumb died of pleurisy in Washington, D.C., on December 20, 1820.  He was buried in the Congressional Cemetery.

See also
List of United States Congress members who died in office (1790–1899)

References

External links
  

Burials at the Congressional Cemetery
1780 births
1820 deaths
Federalist Party members of the United States House of Representatives from North Carolina
19th-century American politicians